Intubation (sometimes entubation) is a medical procedure involving the insertion of a tube into the body. Patients are generally anesthetized beforehand. Examples include tracheal intubation, and the balloon tamponade with a Sengstaken–Blakemore tube (a tube into the gastrointestinal tract).

Examples
 Catheterization
 Nasogastric intubation
 Tracheal intubation

References 

Airway management
Emergency medical procedures
Medical equipment
Routes of administration